Shafa'a is an Islamic prayer (salat) that is performed at night after Isha (night-time prayer) or before Witr (odd or imparity prayer).

Presentation
The term Chafa'a is cited in the Quran into the Āyah 3 of Surah Al-Fajr:

Recitation

The jurists have relied on the loudness and the silence in the Chafa'a prayer, as well as the Witr prayer, which is part of the law of God, which requires that the recitation be in the entire night prayer, including Chafa'a and Witr, sometimes loudly and sometimes in silence.

This jurisprudential opinion was based on the prophetic hadith narrated by the Mother of the Believers Aisha bint Abi Bakr in the Sunan Abu Dawood and Musnad Ahmad ibn Hanbal, which reads:

Imam Ibn Abi Zayd al-Qayrawani said in his book Al-Risalah:

Liaison with Witr
Muslim jurists (fuqaha) believe that it is mandatory (mustahabb) to separate the two rak'ahs of the "Chafa'a prayer" by performing the taslim to get out of them, before continuing to perform the only rak'ah for the Witr prayer afterwards.

These jurists considered that the makruh ruling of the Islamic Ahkam applies to the case of joining the Chafa'a prayer with the Witr prayer afterwards without separating them by pronouncing the phrase of taslim.

The scholars of fiqh schools (madhahib) also relied on the rules of the principles of Islamic jurisprudence to determine that it is objectionable (makruh) to limit the performance of the Witr without being preceded by Chafa'a.

Compensation

If a Muslim does not perform the Chafa'a and Witr prayers until dawn and until he performs the Fajr fard prayer, then he must make them up during the day to compensate for giving up on them during the previous night.

Since the supererogatory prayer (nafl prayer) is performed during the hours of the day in a silent voice, the fulfillment of the Chafa'a and Witr prayers is performed in a non-loud voice, as when the Duha prayer is performed in a non-loud voice.

Maliki jurists have acknowledged that the bass voice is a delegate (mustahabb) in reciting the two Chafa'a and Witr prayers, whether he prays them at night after the evening prayer (Isha) or makes up for them after the dawn prayer (Fajr).

Gallery

See also
 Witr
 Fajr nafl prayer

References

Salah
Salah terminology
Night in culture